Sørmarka Arena is an indoor multi-purpose ice rink located in Stavanger, Norway. It consists of a 400-meter speed skating rink, an ice hockey rink, six curling rinks, and a "penguin rink" for newbeginners. It can seat 4,000 spectators.

The venue was not designed to host concerts, but on 6 June 2010 a Whitney Houston concert was held with 13,000 spectators. It was not possible to place the stage on the short end, and instead it had to be placed on the long end, making seating difficult.

References

Speed skating venues in Norway
Indoor ice hockey venues in Norway
Indoor speed skating venues
Sports venues in Stavanger